Walter P. Shirlaw, known as Watty Shirlaw (born 1902) was a Scottish professional footballer who played as a goalkeeper.

Career
Born Wishaw, Shirlaw played for Larkhall Thistle, Bradford City, Rochdale, Halifax Town and Workington. For Bradford City, he made a total of 99 appearances in the Football League; he also made 12 FA Cup appearances.

Sources

References

1902 births
Year of death missing
Scottish footballers
Larkhall Thistle F.C. players
Bradford City A.F.C. players
Rochdale A.F.C. players
Halifax Town A.F.C. players
Workington A.F.C. players
English Football League players
Association football goalkeepers